Sebastian Beltrame (born 19 June 1983) is an Argentine biathlete. He competed in the men's 20 km individual event at the 2006 Winter Olympics.

References

External links
 

1983 births
Living people
Argentine male biathletes
Olympic biathletes of Argentina
Biathletes at the 2006 Winter Olympics
People from Ushuaia